The 2005–06 Virginia Tech Hokies men's basketball team represented Virginia Polytechnic Institute and State University during the 2005–06 NCAA Division I men's basketball season. The Hokies were led by third-year head coach Seth Greenberg and played their home games at Cassell Coliseum in Blacksburg, Virginia as second-year members of the Atlantic Coast Conference. They finished the season 14–16, 4–12 in ACC play to finish a tie for tenth place. As the No. 10 seed in the ACC tournament, they were defeated in the first round by Virginia 56–60.

Last season
The Hokies finished the 2004–05 season 16–14, 8–8 in ACC play to finish in a tie for fourth place. They were defeated 54–73 by Georgia Tech in the quarterfinals of the ACC tournament. They were invited to the National Invitation Tournament where they defeated Temple in the first round to advance to the second round where they lost to Memphis.

Roster

2005–2006 schedule and results

|-
!colspan=12 style=|

|-
!colspan=12 style=| ACC tournament

Source

References

Virginia Tech Hokies men's basketball seasons
Virginia Tech
Virginia Tech
Virginia Tech